The velar ejective fricative is a type of consonantal sound, used in some spoken languages.

Features
Features of the velar ejective fricative:

Occurrence

See also
 List of phonetic topics

External links
 

Fricative consonants
Velar consonants
Ejectives
Oral consonants